The Man from Mexico is a 1914 silent film produced by the Famous Players Film Company and Daniel Frohman. It starred John Barrymore in his second feature film and was remade in 1926 as Let's Get Married starring Richard Dix. The film was rereleased by Paramount in 1919 as part of the company's "Success Series" reissue of early successes. The Man from Mexico is now a lost film.

The film is based on a Broadway play by Henry A. DuSouchet and was first performed in 1897 with William Collier, Sr. Collier toured the play and it became a staple of his repertoire.

Cast
John Barrymore - Fitzhugh
Wellington Playter - Prison Warden
Harold Lockwood - Danton
Pauline Neff - Clementia Fitzhew
Anton Ascher - Schmidt
Fred Annerly - Louis
Winona Winter - Sally
Nathaniel Sack

See also
John Barrymore filmography

References

External links
The Man from Mexico at IMDb.com
The Man from Mexico; allmovie synopsis
lantern slide

1914 films
American silent feature films
American films based on plays
Lost American films
1914 comedy films
Silent American comedy films
American black-and-white films
Films directed by Thomas N. Heffron
1914 lost films
Lost comedy films
1910s American films